The Coronavirus (Scotland) Act 2020 is an Act of the Scottish Parliament to make provisions during the COVID-19 pandemic. The Act complements and regulates the use of emergency powers given to Scottish Ministers under the UK Parliament's Coronavirus Act 2020. The Act makes many provisions to ease regulations in sectors that may struggle to meet their statutory requirements, such as the NHS, Social Security Scotland and the Scottish Courts and Tribunals Service.

Provisions
The Act makes a variety of provisions to ensure continuity throughout Scotland during the Coronavirus pandemic. This covers a broad variety of issues within Scotland where it would be impossible for statutory requirements to be met or where regulations have become unworkable, notably in terms of:
 Housing provision and evictions
 Social Security Scotland assessments
 Judicial operations
 Healthcare regulations
 Death certification
 Miscellaneous provisions

Time limit and renewal
Part 1 of the Act expires on 30 September 2020, however Scottish Ministers can extend the act twice on a six-monthly basis. This can only be achieved through affirmation of the Scottish Parliament.

Debate
The Act was developed by the Scottish Government on a cross-party basis to ensure maximum support. Concerns were raised at the prospect of removing the requirement of juries within judicial trials. This was accepted by the government and removed from the bill before passage. The Bill was passed unanimously.

Legislative history
The bill was introduced to Parliament on 31 March 2020 as an Emergency Bill, with all three legislative stages completed the following day. The Bill was given Royal Assent and made law on 6 April 2020.

See also
 Coronavirus Act 2020
 COVID-19 pandemic

References

Acts of the Scottish Parliament 2020
2020 in Scotland
COVID-19 pandemic in Scotland
Law associated with the COVID-19 pandemic in the United Kingdom